The Reid Report is an hour-long weekday U.S. and world political commentary program on MSNBC. Hosted by Joy-Ann Reid, it premiered on February 24, 2014, in the time slot formerly occupied by NewsNation with Tamron Hall. The show ended on February 27, 2015 due to low ratings.

References

External links
 
 The Reid Report on Twitter

2014 American television series debuts
2015 American television series endings
2010s American television news shows
2010s American television talk shows
English-language television shows
MSNBC original programming